William Routledge may refer to:
 William Routledge (priest), Scottish Episcopalian priest
 William Scoresby Routledge, British ethnographer, anthropologist and adventurer
 Bill Routledge, English footballer